Mark Landin is a former municipality in the Uckermark district, in Brandenburg, Germany. It was merged into the town Schwedt on 19 April 2022. It consisted of the villages Grünow, Landin and Schönermark, which became Ortsteile of Schwedt.

Demography

References

Localities in Uckermark (district)
Former municipalities in Brandenburg
Schwedt